Awareness ribbons are symbols meant to show support or raise consciousness for a cause. Different colours and patterns are associated with different issues.

Yellow ribbons, in the United States, are used to show that a close family member is abroad in military service. In Russia, Belarus and other countries of the former Soviet Union, gold and black striped ribbons are used to celebrate the Allies' victory in World War II (9 May). In Spain since 2017, a yellow ribbon is a symbol of solidarity with the 2017–18 Spanish constitutional crisis in provisional detention.

Of the uses of ribbons to draw awareness to health issues, perhaps the best-known is the pink ribbon for support of those with breast cancer. Other health and social concerns which have adopted coloured ribbons include Alzheimer's disease, pancreatic cancer (purple), HIV/AIDS (red), mental health and mental illness (green), suicide prevention (yellow), and brain disorder or disability (silver).

Political use of ribbons include orange ribbons to commemorate the Orange Revolution in Ukraine.

Other ornaments, including flowers (of specific kinds), bracelets and badges may serve essentially the same purpose of drawing attention to a cause. These include poppies, rosettes and wristbands.

History 
The first ribbons that were represented as meaningful objects in history were the tokens given to knights during the Middle Ages in Europe. The yellow ribbon came from the Puritan Army during the English Civil War. From there, it spread to the Americas, where the Army of the United States became associated with it. A yellow ribbon was mentioned in a marching song, sung by the military in the United States. In the year 1917 George A. Norton copyrighted the song for the first time. The title of the song was "Round Her Neck She Wears a Yeller Ribbon". In the 1940s the song was rewritten by several musicians.

In the early 1970s, the song "Tie a Yellow Ribbon Round the Ole Oak Tree" was released, and based on this song, Penney Laingen, wife of Iran hostage Bruce Laingen, was the first who used the ribbon as an awareness symbol. She tied yellow ribbons around trees, to illustrate desire for her husband coming home. Her friends and family members followed the trend. As many individuals were able to see this message, the "ribbon became a medium".

During the 1979–1981 spate of child murders in Atlanta, green lapel ribbons began to be worn to show solidarity. They were of a different form than later awareness ribbons, being typically bow-shaped.

In May 1986, the AIDS Faith Alliance, later to be known as Christian Action on AIDS, held an open conference on AIDS at Notting Hill Gate in London, supported by the Archbishop of Canterbury and other United Kingdom Christian church leaders. Rainbow Ribbons were given to everybody attending. The purpose of Christian Action on AIDS, an official Church of England charity whose founder/chairman was Barnaby Miln, was to get the worldwide Christian churches involved in the crisis that was AIDS. The Christian Action on AIDS to fold in 1991.

In 1991, the red ribbon was created by the Visual AIDS Artists Caucus, a New York–based group of artists and AIDS activist. They wished to create a visual symbol to demonstrate compassion for people living with AIDS and their caregivers. The color red was chosen for its "connection to blood and the idea of passion"—both anger and love.  During the 1991 Tony Awards, actor Jeremy Irons wore the bright red ribbon pinned on his chest. Though the symbolism of the ribbon was not allowed to be discussed on air, the media and public noticed the eye catching ribbon, and its popularity grew overnight. The red ribbon was purposefully not copyrighted in the United States, to allow it to be worn and used widely as a symbol in the fight against AIDS. The year 1992 was declared by The New York Times as "The year of the Ribbon".

Today the red ribbon is an internationally recognized symbol of AIDS awareness and a design icon. It has led the way for many other color ribbons and awareness projects.

The Unicode character standard has a "reminder ribbon" character (🎗️) at code point U+1F397. No color is specified for it, and platforms vary in its presentation; it can appear yellow, blue, or red depending on the device or software in which it is viewed.

Purpose and usage 
Ribbons can be used simply to raise awareness of a disease or signify that an individual has been personally affected by that disease or condition. People often place ribbons around college campuses, throughout neighborhoods, and in public business places so that others can see them and realize they are not alone in their battle. Ribbon colors are often associated with one or more conditions but there are several sources that define what color relates to which condition. They also provide an outline of the dates in which that ribbon is significant. Ribbons are often promoted to signify the prevalence of a specific disease or condition.

There are ribbon colors that also associate with animals and organizations that work with animals. The Animal Legal Defense Fund fights for the rights of all animals alike while displaying and orange ribbon. Animal abuse awareness is also well known for its use of the purple ribbon.

See also
Consciousness raising
List of awareness ribbons
Political colour

References

Further reading

External links 

 
Ribbon symbolism
1990s fads and trends
Death customs